List of Football Academic All-America Team Members of the Year is a list of the annual selection by College Sports Communicators (known before the 2022–23 school year as College Sports Information Directors of America, or CoSIDA) and its Academic All-America sponsor of the individual athlete selected as the most outstanding of the annual Football Academic All-America selections.  From 1996 to 2011 one winner each was chosen from both the College and University Divisions for all twelve Academic All-America teams including football.  The Academic All-America program recognizes combined athletic and academic excellence of the nation's top student-athletes.  The University Division team included eligible participants from National Collegiate Athletic Association (NCAA) Division I member schools, while the College Division team included scholar-athletes from all of the following: NCAA Division II, NCAA Division III, National Association of Intercollegiate Athletics (NAIA), Canadian universities and colleges and two-year schools.  Currently, each team selects Academic All-District honorees in eight geographic districts across the United States and Canada.  First team All-District honorees make the All-America team ballots. All twelve Academic All-American teams (Men's and women's basketball, men's and women's soccer, men's and women's track & field, men's baseball, women's softball, men's football, women's volleyball and men's and women's at-large teams) had one Academic All-American of the Year each for both the College and University divisions.  One of these twelve sport-by-sport Academic All-Americans of the year is selected as the Academic All-America Team Members of the Year for each division.  The most recent football player to win the all-sports honor is Mac Jones of the University of Alabama, who received the Division I awards for the 2020–21 academic year.

In 2011, the Academic All-America program was expanded from two to four divisions. NCAA Divisions II and III were separated into their own divisions, while the College Division was then restricted to non-NCAA institutions. Most recently, effective with the 2018–19 school year, the College Division was split, with NAIA members now receiving their own set of awards.

Tables of winners
Names in bold indicate winners of the all-sports Academic All-America award.

Two-division era (1991–2010)

Four-division era (2011–present)

Notes

Schools with multiple awards

Notes

Other footnotes

References

External links
 Academic All-America information page

College football national player awards
Foot